The 2003 FIA Sportscar Championship was the third season of FIA Sportscar Championship, an auto racing series regulated by the Fédération Internationale de l'Automobile and organized by the International Racing Series Ltd.  It was the seventh and final season of the series dating back to the International Sports Racing Series of 1997. The series featured sports prototypes divided into two categories, SR1 and SR2, and awarded championships for drivers, constructors, and teams in both classes. The series began on 13 April 2003 and ended on 21 September 2003 after seven races in Europe.

Jan Lammers of the Netherlands won his second consecutive drivers championship for his Racing for Holland Dome outfit, sharing the championship with countryman John Bosch.  Mirko Savolid and Pierguiseppe Peroni also earned a repeat drivers championship in the SR2 category for Lucchini Engineering after winning in five of seven events.

Schedule
The 2003 calendar for the championship featured seven events, six in the traditional 2-hour 30-minute format plus the addition of the 1000 km Spa run in conjunction with the British GT Championship, a return to the 1000 km format last utilized in 1988. Circuito do Estoril began the season in the first visit to Portugal for the series, while Autodromo Nazionale Monza and Donington Park both returned to the series with events held in conjunction with the International Formula 3000 series; Donington would also serve as the first race in the championship to be held at night.  The EuroSpeedway Lausitz would share its event with the Champ Car World Series, while Circuit Paul Armagnac and Motopark Oschersleben were also new events to the series.

Entries

SR1

SR2
All SR2 competitors used Avon tyres.

Results and standings

Race results

Points were awarded to the top eight finishers in each category.  Entries were required to complete 60% of the race distance in order to be classified as a finisher and earn points.  Drivers were required to complete 20% of the total race distance for their car to earn points.  Teams scored points for only their highest finishing entry.  For the 1000 km Spa points were also awarded to the top eight in each category at half distance.

Driver championships

SR1 championship

SR2 championship

Team championships

SR1 championship

SR2 championship

Constructors championships
Constructor champions are open to chassis constructors only.  Engine manufacturers are not considered in the constructor entries.

SR1 championship

SR2 championship

References

External links
Sporting Regulations for the 2003 FIA Sportscar Championship Retrieved from web.archive.org on 14 February 2009
Race results for the 2003 FIA Sportscar Championship Retrieved from www.teamdan.com on 1 November 2009
FIA Sportscar Championship Retrieved from wsrp.ic.cz on 1 November 2009
Photo Gallery of FIA Sportscar Championship Retrieved from www.racingsportscars.com on 1 November 2009

FIA Sportscar Championship
FIA Sportscar Championship